Mpigi is a town in Mawokota County, Mpigi District, in Central Uganda. Mpigi is the municipal, administrative and commercial headquarters of Mpigi District. The district is named after the town.

Location
The location of Mpigi town makes it an access point to the districts of  Mpigi, Wakiso,  Butambala, Gomba,  Mityana, Kalungu and Kalangala, through various fishing landing sites on the shores of Lake Victoria. On Mbale Hill, which lies within the town, resides one of Buganda's most renowned traditional gods; Kibuuka Omumbaale. This hill is the ancestral home of the "Ndiga" (sheep) clan. The geographical coordinates of the town are 0°13'48.0"N 32°19'48.0"E (Latitude:0.2300, Longitude:32.3300).

Population
At the 2002 national census, the population of Mpigi town was 34,400. In 2010, the Uganda Bureau of Statistics (UBOS), estimated the population of the town at 38,300. In 2011, UBOS estimated the population of Mpigi at 38,800. In 2014, the national population census put the population of Mpigi at 43,360.

In 2015, UBOS estimated the population of the town at 44,200. In 2020, the population agency estimated Mpigi's mid-year population at 49,500 people, of whom 25,200 (50.9 percent) were female and 24,300 (49.1 percent) were male. UBOS calculated that the population of Mpigi Town grew at an average rate of 2.29 percent annually, between 2015 and 2020.

Points of interest
The following points of interest are located inside Mpigi Town or close to its borders:

1. The headquarters of Mpigi District Administration

2. The offices of Mpigi Town Council

3. Mpigi Central Market

4. Mpigi Chief Magistrate's Court

5. Mpigi Military Barracks, an establishment of the Uganda People's Defence Force

6. Mpigi Police Barracks, an establishment of the Uganda Police Force

7. Mpigi Prison, an establishment of the Uganda Prisons Department

8. Mpigi Hospital, a 100-bed hospital administered by the Uganda Ministry of Health

9. Kampala-Mpigi Expressway, a four-lane dual carriageway toll road between Kampala and Mpigi, under construction, with completion expected in 2025.

Drums
The town is well known as the capital of the drum factories such as the ngoma drums. All drums here are handmade.

See also
Mpigi District
Central Region, Uganda
List of cities and towns in Uganda

References

External links
Location of Mpigi At Google Maps
 Mpigi Hospital Launches CD4 Count Technology: 1 July 2011

Mpigi District
Populated places in Central Region, Uganda
Cities in the Great Rift Valley